Valtetsi is a former municipality in Arcadia, Peloponnese, Greece. Since the 2011 local government reform it is part of the municipality Tripoli, of which it is a municipal unit. The municipal unit has an area of 210.243 km2. Population 917 (2011). The seat of the municipality was in Asea. Valtetsi is located in the highlands southwest of Tripoli and northeast of Megalopoli.

Subdivisions
The municipal unit Valtetsi is subdivided into the following communities (constituent villages in brackets):
Agriakona
Ampelaki (Ampelaki, Lianos)
Arachamites
Asea (Asea, Kato Asea)
Athinaio (Athinaio, Marmaria)
Dafni (Dafni, Maniatis)
Dorizas
Kaltezes (Kaltezes, Kouvelia)
Kerastaris
Manaris
Mavrogiannis
Palaiochouni
Paparis
Valtetsi

Population

External links
Valtetsi on GTP Travel Pages

References

 
Populated places in Arcadia, Peloponnese